The Karavan shooting was a notable gun crime which took place in Ukraine's capital of Kyiv on September 26, 2012.

Events
The incident saw suspect Yaroslav Mazurok (or Mazurka) supposedly taken to the back room of the Karavan Shopping Mall by security guards. At this point, he produced a gun and shot dead three of the security guards, seriously injuring a fourth, before escaping.

The case stunned Ukraine, soon becoming one of the most infamous incidents of gun crime since Ukrainian independence (1991). Accused shooter Mazurok then apparently went on the run for over a month, before his body was found in the woods near Kyiv's Dorohozhychi metro station. The police reported him as being a former armer, and a trained assassin, however his family protested his innocence, with his wife claiming he was a labourer, and had been framed.

References

2012 in Ukraine
Deaths by firearm in Ukraine
2012 murders in Ukraine
2010s in Kyiv
September 2012 crimes
Mass shootings in Ukraine
2012 mass shootings in Europe
Attacks on shopping malls
Filmed killings
September 2012 events in Ukraine